The following is a list of past and present operators of the Fokker F28 incl. Fokker F28-0070 (Fokker 70) and Fokker F28-0100 (Fokker 100):

Civil operators
Many of these air carriers formerly operated Fokker F28 aircraft.  Fokker 70 and Fokker 100 former operators where known are included as well.

Aerolíneas Argentinas
LADE - Líneas Aéreas Del Estado
American Falcon
Dinar Líneas Aéreas
LAER - Líneas Aéreas de Entre Rios

Ansett
Ansett Express
Ansett NT
Ansett W.A.
East-West Airlines
Flight West Airlines
MacRobertson Miller Airlines

Biman Bangladesh Airlines

Air Canada (F28 aircraft operated by regional code sharing affiliates)
Air Niagara
Air Ontario
Atlantic Island Airways
Canadian North (operated Fokker 100 and F28 aircraft)
Canadian Regional Airlines
Intair (Fokker 100 operator)
Inter-Canadien (operated Fokker 100 and F28 aircraft)
Jetsgo (Fokker 100 operator)
Norcanair
Peregrine Air Charter
Time Air (largest F28 user in Canada)
Transair 
Quebecair

Cimber Air
Scandinavian Airlines

Icaro Air
TAME

Blue1 (former operator)

Air Gabon

Bavaria Germanair (Germanair in 1972-1976)

Ghana Airways

Aviateca

Garuda Indonesia (largest user with 62 F28 aircraft in the fleet)
Kal Star Aviation
Pelita Air Service

Itavia
Unifly

Air Ivoire

Royal Jordanian
[ South Korea]
*Korean air 

Click Mexicana (Fokker 100 operator, Mexicana Airlines subsidiary)
Mexicana Airlines (Fokker 100 operator)
Aviacsa (Fokker 100 operator)

Montenegro Airlines

Myanma Airways

KLM Cityhopper (Fokker 70 and Fokker 100 operator, KLM Royal Dutch Airlines subsidiary)
Martinair
NLM CityHopper

Nigeria Airways

Braathens (Braathens S.A.F.E)
Scandinavian Airlines

Air Nauru

Air Niugini

Aeroperú
TANS Perú (crashed as TANS Perú Flight 222 in 2003)

Comair (South Africa) (1992–1996)

Korean Air

Iberia

Royal Swazi National Airways

Linjeflyg
Scandinavian Airlines

Air Tanzania

Inter Airlines
Turkish Airlines

Air Anglia
Air UK

Air21
Altair Airlines
American Airlines (former Fokker 100 operator)
America West Express (Fokker 70 aircraft operated by Desert Sun Airlines, a subsidiary of Mesa Airlines)
Business Express (acquired a Pilgrim Airlines F28 but did not operate it)
Empire Airlines (merged into Piedmont Airlines (1948-1989))
Horizon Air (wholly owned subsidiary of Alaska Air Group)
Mid Pacific Air
Midway Airlines (Fokker 100 operator)
Piedmont Airlines (merged into USAir)
Pilgrim Airlines (acquired by Business Express)
USAir (former Fokker F28 and Fokker 100 operator, renamed US Airways)
Wayne Newton

Military and government operators

Military operators

 Algerian Air Force 

Argentine Air Force
Argentine Naval Aviation

Bolivian Air Force

Cote d'Ivoire Air Force

Colombian Air Force

Ecuadorian Air Force

Gabon Air Force 

Ghana Air Force

Indonesian Air Force

Royal Malaysian Air Force

Royal Flight

Peruvian Air Force
 
Philippine Air Force

Togo Air Force

Government operators

Department of Transport (1972–82)

Tanzania Government Flight Agency

F28